Hayley Reide Peirsol (born August 9, 1985) is an American former distance swimmer. She swam under Dave Salo with Irvine Novaquatics prior to attending Auburn University. While at Auburn, Peirsol trained under David Marsh, Dorsey Tierney and the late Ralph Crocker. She earned 3 individual NCAA titles and 3 individual SEC titles in the 1650 freestyle as well as 3 NCAA and 4 SEC team titles. In 2006 and 2007, Peirsol also trained with Club Wolverine at the University of Michigan along with teammates Erik Vendt, Michael Phelps, Klete and Kalyn Keller, and Kaitlin Sandeno under Bob Bowman and distance expert Jon Urbanchek. In 2006, Hayley became the third woman in history to ever break 16 minutes in the 1500 meter freestyle, the other two women being Janet Evans and Kate Ziegler.

In 2007, Peirsol retired from swimming with the desire of making her name known as a triathlete. She trained under former World Champion Siri Lindley in Santa Monica, California with teammates Mirinda Carfrae (2010 Ironman World Champion), Jenny Fletcher and New Zealander Samantha Warriner. In May 2009 she took second place in her first ITU race which was in her brother's hometown of Austin, Texas.[2] Hayley received the Rookie of the Year award in 2009 from the ITU federation for her accomplishments in her new sport.

Peirsol then moved to Berkeley, California, after retiring from competitive sports. In the Bay Area, she attended a three-year program at Rudolf Steiner's Bay Area Center for Waldorf Teacher Training. In 2016 she moved to Costa Rica where she was the lead teacher in a start-up Waldorf School in Lake Arenal, and did youth work in Nosara, teaching children about ocean safety and environmental awareness. Peirsol  now lives in Lake Como, Italy.

Her brother, American backstroker Aaron Peirsol, is a multiple Olympic Games gold medalist, having competed in Greece, Australia and China. Hayley and Aaron are the first of two sibling duos to medal at the same FINA World Championships (in 2003 and 2007), along with Bronte Campbell and Cate Campbell who earned a silver medal on the same 4x100 meter freestyle relay in Barcelona in 2013.

Best times 
 LC 400 m Free - 04:06.31, 2006 ConocoPhillips National Championships,  August 1, 2006
 LC 800 m Free - 08:26.41, 2007 World Championships, March 31, 2007
 LC 1500 m Free - 15:57.36, 2006 Pan Pacific Swimming Championships,  August 17, 2006
 LC 400 m Individual Medley - 04:48.30, 2002 ConocoPhillips National Championships, August 12, 2002

See also
 List of World Aquatics Championships medalists in swimming (women)

References

External links 
 
 
 
 

1985 births
Living people
American female freestyle swimmers
American female triathletes
Auburn Tigers women's swimmers
People from Irvine, California
World Aquatics Championships medalists in swimming
Universiade medalists in swimming
Universiade gold medalists for the United States
Universiade silver medalists for the United States
Medalists at the 2005 Summer Universiade